The Webb School is a private coeducational college preparatory boarding and day school in Bell Buckle, Tennessee, USA, founded in 1870. It has been called the oldest continuously operating boarding school in the South. Under founder Sawney Webb's leadership, the school produced more Rhodes Scholars than any other secondary school in the United States.

Mission 
As expressed by William R. Webb, the school's mission is "To turn out young people who are tireless workers and who know how to work effectively; who are accurate scholars, who know the finer points of morals and practice them in their daily living; who are always courteous [without the slightest trace of snobbery]." (Bracketed text was removed from the official mission of the school in the late 20th century but is commonly added to oral recitations by faculty and students.)

History
William R. "Sawney" Webb started the Webb School as a school for boys in Culleoka, Tennessee, in 1870. He was joined by his brother, John M. Webb, in 1873.

After Vanderbilt University was founded in 1873, Webb School's "oldest and best boys" were able to enroll.

Webb moved the school from Culleoka to its present-day location, a 145-acre campus in the small town of Bell Buckle, in 1886 after Culleoka incorporated and legalized the sale of alcohol in the new city.

Sawney Webb's son W. R. Webb Jr., known as "Son Will", joined the school as a teacher in 1897 and became co-principal of the school with his father and uncle in 1908, unable to establish his own career. After their deaths (John Webb died in 1916 of a stroke and Sawney Webb in 1926 of old age), he became headmaster and remained in that position until his retirement in 1952.

Webb began admitting girls as boarding students in 1973, but earlier in its history Webb had allowed local girls to attend as day students.

Notable alumni 

L. Desaix Anderson: career United States Foreign Service officer specializing in East Asian affairs, and former American Chargé d'Affaires ad interim to Vietnam
Byron De La Beckwith, Ku Klux Klansman convicted of the assassination of civil rights leader Medgar Evers 
William West Bond: architect and designer for Holiday Inn hotels
Lewis M. Branscomb: professor emeritus at Harvard Kennedy School
Hayne D. Boyden: Naval aviator and Brigadier general, USMC
Edward Ward Carmack: attorney, newspaper editor, and U.S. Senator (Tennessee)
Jac Chambliss: lawyer, poet and Fellow of the Royal Society of Arts of London
Robert Collins: American physician and pathologist
Prentice Cooper: governor of Tennessee, 1939-1945
Frank Constantine: chief of ophthalmic surgery at the Manhattan Eye, Ear and Throat Hospital
Paul Craft: American country singer-songwriter
Scott Crichton (class of 1972): judge of the 1st Judicial District Court in Shreveport, Louisiana, since 1991
Ewin L. Davis: chairman of the Federal Trade Commission
Norman H. Davis: chairman of the American Red Cross; U.S. diplomat at 1918 Versailles Conference and 1933 Geneva Conference
Harold Earthman: member of the U.S. House of Representatives
William Eggleston: photographer
William Yandell Elliott: Rhodes Scholar, Vanderbilt Fugitive, Harvard government professor, mentor of Henry Kissinger
Charles Flexner: American physician, clinical pharmaceutical scientist, academic, author and researcher
Robert J. Gilliland: pioneer of American aviation, chief test pilot and first to fly Lockheed SR-71 Blackbird.
Andrew Glaze: award winning American poet and writer.
Thomas Watt Gregory: Attorney General of the United States, 1914-1919
Doug Holder: representative, Florida House of Representatives 2006-2014
Jeffrey Lorberbaum: chairman and chief executive officer of Mohawk Industries
Walter W. Manley: attorney, distinguished professor of business.
William F. McCombs: chairman of the Democratic National Committee (1912-1914)
Raymond Ross Paty: president of the University of Alabama, 1942-1946; chancellor of the University of Georgia system, 1946-1948
John Andrew Rice: co-founder and first rector, Black Mountain College
Wayne Rogers: screen actor, portrayed Trapper John on M*A*S*H; investment analyst for Fox News network
Vermont C. Royster: editor of the Wall Street Journal, winner of two Pulitzer Prizes and the Presidential Medal of Freedom
Paul Sanger: pioneer in cardiology and thoracic surgery, founder of the Sanger Clinic
Manny Sethi: physician at Vanderbilt University Medical Center.
Ingram M. Stainback: Governor of Hawaii, 1942-1951
Allen Steele: Hugo Award-winning science fiction author
Robert McGill Thomas, Jr.: Pulitzer Prize nominated reporter for The New York Times renowned for his obituaries, some of which are compiled in the book 52 McG's: The Best Obituaries from Legendary New York Times Writer Robert McG. Thomas Jr.
John J. Tigert: first Rhodes Scholar from Tennessee, U.S. Commissioner of Education (1921–1928), third president of the University of Florida (1928–1947), member of the College Football Hall of Fame
Paul Trousdale: American real estate developer best known for developing Trousdale Estates in Beverly Hills, California
Elton Watkins: U.S. Congressman from Oregon 1923-1925
Michael Tate Westbrook: commanding officer of the USS Spruance (DDG-111) 2010-2012
Fielding L. Wright: governor of Mississippi, 1946-1952

Related schools
Sawney Webb's son and grandson later established The Webb Schools in Claremont, California, and the Webb School of Knoxville in Knoxville, Tennessee, respectively.

References

External links
 The Webb School
 The Gentle Scholar: The Forgotten Story of John M Webb and the Webb School in Bell Buckle, Tennessee
 The Webb School of Bell Buckle

Boarding schools in Tennessee
Educational institutions established in 1870
Preparatory schools in Tennessee
Private high schools in Tennessee
Schools in Bedford County, Tennessee
1870 establishments in Tennessee